, a Japanese name that means Castle Mountain, may refer to:

Places
 Mount Shiroyama, Motegi, Tochigi, Japan
 Mount Shiroyama (Kagoshima), Japan; the site of the Battle of Shiroyama
 Shiroyama, Kanagawa, a town that is now merged into Midori-ku, Japan
 Shiroyama Park, a public park established around the ruins of Takayama Castle, Takayama, Gifu, Japan

Other uses
 Battle of Shiroyama, 1877
 Shiroyama Dam, on the Sagami River in Sagamihara, Kanagawa Prefecture, Honshū, Japan
 Shiroyama Hachimangu, a Shinto shrine in Nagoya, Japan
 "Shiroyama", a song by Sabaton from The Last Stand

See also
 Castle Mountain (disambiguation)
 Yamashiro (disambiguation)

Japanese-language surnames